Saldanha is an interchange station in central Lisbon, where the Red and Yellow Lines of the Lisbon Metro connect.

History
The Yellow Line station is one of the 11 stations that belong to the original Lisbon Metro network, opened on 29 December 1959, and it is located in Praça Duque de Saldanha, which gives the station its name. The architectural design of the original Yellow Line station is by Falcão e Cunha. On 14 March 1977, the Yellow Line station was extended, based on the architectural design of Falcão e Cunha and Sanchez Jorge. On 28 December 1996, the Yellow Line station's northern atrium was refurbished, and on 17 May 1997, the Yellow Line station's southern atrium was also refurbished, both based on the architectural design by Paulo Brito da Silva.

On 29 August 2009 the Red Line station was built, based on the architectural design by Germano Venade and located under Avenida Duque D'Ávila, serving the Avenidas Novas area of the city and the nearby Instituto Superior Técnico. On the same day, the Yellow Line station's northern atrium was again refurbished, based on the architectural design of Paulo Brito da Silva and Sofia Carrilho.

Connections

Urban buses

Carris 
 207 Cais do Sodré ⇄ Fetais (morning service)
 727 Estação Roma-Areeiro ⇄ Restelo – Av. das Descobertas 
 736 Cais do Sodré ⇄ Odivelas (Bairro Dr. Lima Pimentel)
 738 Quinta dos Barros ⇄ Alto de Santo Amaro
 744 Marquês de Pombal ⇄ Moscavide (Quinta das Laranjeiras)
 783 Amoreiras (Centro Comercial) ⇄ Portela – Rua Mouzinho de Albuquerque

Aerobus 
 Linha 2 Aeroporto ⇄ Sete Rios

See also
 List of Lisbon metro stations

References

External links

Yellow Line (Lisbon Metro) stations
Red Line (Lisbon Metro) stations
Railway stations opened in 1959